The 2012–13 VfB Stuttgart II season is the season for the reserve team for VfB Stuttgart. The season began on 21 July 2012 and will end on 18 May 2013. They are participating in the 3. Liga.

Review and events
The season began on 21 July 2012 with a loss against 1. FC Saarbrücken and will end on 18 May 2013 against Borussia Dortmund II. They are participating in the 3. Liga.

Fixtures and results

Legend

3. Liga

League fixtures and results

Table

League table

Summary table

Squad statistics

|-
! colspan="8" style="background:#dcdcdc; text-align:center"| Goalkeepers

|-
! colspan="8" style="background:#dcdcdc; text-align:center"| Defenders

|-
! colspan="8" style="background:#dcdcdc; text-align:center"| Midfielders

|-
! colspan="8" style="background:#dcdcdc; text-align:center"| Forwards

|-
| colspan="8" style="background:#dcdcdc; text-align:center"| Sources:

|}

References

Match reports

Other sources

Stuttgart 2
2012-13 2